London Spy is a British-American five-part drama television serial created and written by Tom Rob Smith that aired on BBC Two from 9 November until 7 December 2015. It was aired on Netflix in 2018.

Plot
London Spy begins as the story of two young men: Danny (Ben Whishaw)—gregarious, hedonistic, and romantic—falls in love with Alex (Edward Holcroft)—asocial, enigmatic, and brilliant. Just as they discover how perfect they are for each other, Alex disappears. Danny finds Alex's body. They lived very different lives: Danny is from a world of clubbing and youthful excess; Alex, it turns out, worked for the Secret Intelligence Service.  Although utterly ill-equipped to take on the world of espionage, Danny decides to fight for the truth about Alex's death.

Cast

Main
 Ben Whishaw as Daniel "Danny" Edward Holt
 Jim Broadbent as Scottie
 Edward Holcroft as Alistair "Alex" Turner
 Samantha Spiro as Detective Taylor
 Lorraine Ashbourne as Mrs. Turner / Nanny
 David Hayman as Mr. Turner / Groundsman
 Clarke Peters as the American
 Charlotte Rampling as Frances Turner
 Mark Gatiss as Rich
 Harriet Walter as Claire
 James Fox as James
 Adrian Lester as Professor Marcus Shaw
 Riccardo Scamarcio as Doppelganger

Recurring
 Josef Altin as Pavel
 Zrinka Cvitešić as Sara
 Nicolas Chagrin as Charles Turner
 Richard Cunningham as Danny's Lawyer

Production
The series was commissioned by Janice Hadlow and Polly Hill, and produced by Guy Heeley for Working Title Television. The executive producers were Juliette Howell, Tim Bevan, Eric Fellner, and Polly Hill. Filming began in 2014 in London, West London Film Studios, Kent, on the Isle of Grain and at Dartford.

The story was inspired by the death of Gareth Williams, an MI6 agent found dead under similar, mysterious circumstances.

Release
The first episode premiered in the U.K. on BBC Two at 9pm on Monday 9 November 2015, and the serial concluded 7 December 2015. In the U.S., it premiered on BBC America starting 21 January 2016. In 2018 it was carried on Netflix.

Episodes

Critical reception
Reviewing Episode One for The Guardian, Lucy Mangan called it "an unutterably delicious, satisfying dish," with "Jim Broadbent, in fully teddy-bear-carrying-a-switchblade mode.." and Whishaw "the most powerful actor ever made out of thistledown and magic." The Daily Telegraphs Jasper Rees was unconvinced: "Whishaw's intense fixity of purpose could do nothing to defibrillate his DOA dialogue..." The same newspaper's Harry Mount gave a critical review of episode 3 which he regarded as "wearily unconvincing" with "long spells of ennui."

After Episode 4 had screened, several prominent critics agreed that, whatever they thought of its story, the series possessed a haunting quality. Gabriel Tate of The Daily Telegraph wrote: "London Spy, has been adored and abhorred. Its ambition has delighted and infuriated, its obfuscation has intrigued and frustrated. It is, if nothing else, a singular vision..." A.A. Gill of The Sunday Times wrote: "This is a strange, inexplicably compelling story. There are vast lacunas in the plot, filled with the unblinking performance of Ben Whishaw, made more memorable because most of it is done without words. Everyone else revolves around him, but he remains essentially a hole at the centre of the doughnut. It is a characterisation of great depth, in a plot that is nothing more than a series of enigmas, presented enigmatically."

Jack Searle in The Guardian called it an "intoxicating series" with "a beguiling emotional aesthetic." "It was inevitable that, when prosaic explanation finally had to intrude on all this elliptical artistry, the spell was partly broken. A thriller hasn't so boldly made the genre beautiful since The Shadow Line. London Spy has lived in the gap between plot and subtext – between what it's about, and what it's really about. It's really about self-knowledge, and how lovers try to know each other while lying about themselves."

Following the screening of the final episode, Gabriel Tate wrote in The Guardian that the series had "a somewhat daft and implausible ending, but there was still much to enjoy, mostly from the brilliant Ben Whishaw." Benji Wilson in The Daily Telegraph called it "wonderful and infuriating in equal measure..Has there ever been a television series that's frustrated as much as London Spy (BBC 2)? Over five weeks this contemporary thriller has scaled giddy heights and then plumbed ludicrous depths, gone from being completely gripping to turgid as hell, thrown up single scenes of startling brilliance then followed them with some preposterous self-indulgence... London Spy potentially great script was in desperate need of some doughty editing."

The Guardian Mark Lawson named the series one of the best shows of 2015.

The series was nominated for the British Academy Television Award for Best Mini-Series and the GLAAD Media Award for Outstanding TV Movie or Limited Series.

References

External links
 
 
 London Spy on BBC America
 

2015 British television series debuts
2015 British television series endings
2010s British LGBT-related drama television series
2010s British mystery television series
BBC mystery television shows
BBC television dramas
English-language television shows
Gay-related television shows
Secret Intelligence Service in fiction
Television series by Working Title Television
Television shows set in London
American spy thriller television series